Arhynchobatidae is a family of skates and is commonly known as the softnose skates. It belongs to the order Rajiformes in the superorder Batoidea of rays. At least 104 species have been described, in 13 genera. Softnose skates have at times been placed in the same family as hardnose skates, but most recent authors recognize them as a distinct family. Members of the Arhynchobatidae can be distinguished from hardnose skates in having a soft and flexible snout, as well as a more or less reduced rostrum.

Genera
The 13 recognized genera of softnose skates are:
 Arhynchobatis
 Atlantoraja
 Bathyraja
 Brochiraja
 Insentiraja
 Irolita
 Notoraja
 Pavoraja
 Psammobatis
 Pseudoraja
 Rhinoraja
 Rioraja
 Sympterygia

Conservation
In 2010, Greenpeace International added the spotback skate to its seafood red list. "The Greenpeace International seafood red list is a list of fish that are commonly sold in supermarkets around the world, and which have a very high risk of being sourced from unsustainable fisheries."

References

External links

.
Ray families
Fish described in 1934
Taxa named by Henry Weed Fowler